, (born Osaka Prefecture, January 27, 1961) is a former Japanese rugby union player. He played as hooker.

Career
He started his career playing for the Osaka Institute of Technology and then, for Meiji University. In 1979, Fujita grabbed a regular position in his university years, contributing to the victory in the National University Championship of the same year. In the 1982 season, he served as captain for the Meiji University team.
In 1980, he debuted for Japan in a test match against Netherlands at Hilversum, on October 4, 1980. Afterwards, he served as hooker for the Japan national rugby union team for many years, and played in the 1987 and 1991 Rugby World Cups consecutively. In the 1987 Rugby World Cup, Fujita played all the three pool games.
After graduating from Meiji University, he played for Nisshin Steel, but then, moved for IBM Japan, which he also coached. After retiring as player, he coached several teams such as IBM Big Blue, Kubota Spears, Meiji University and Nihon University RFC.

Notes

References
"The World Rugby" （Nobuhiko Otomo、Shinchōsha、）, page 44
"Rugby Waseda vs Meiji 80 years" （BASEBALL MAGAZINE SHA Co.、）

External links
Tsuyoshi Fujita international stats

1961 births
Living people
Rugby union coaches
Sportspeople from Osaka Prefecture
Japanese rugby union players
Rugby union hookers
Japan international rugby union players